Dilara Uçan (born 15 April 2002) is a Turkish weightlifter competing in the 76 kg division.

Sport career
She won the bronze medal in the women's 76 kg event at the 2022 European Weightlifting Championships held in Tirana, Albania.

References

External links
 

2002 births
Living people
Turkish female weightlifters
European Weightlifting Championships medalists
Islamic Solidarity Games competitors for Turkey
Islamic Solidarity Games medalists in weightlifting
21st-century Turkish women